Paul Francke (born June 16, 1979) is an American songwriter and instrumentalist. He formed the synthpop band Alsace Lorraine in 1998 with guitarist Hewson Chen of the Parasol Records group Vitesse, signing with Darla Records in 1999. His music has focused on central Appalachian subjects, the band name referring to Appalachia's history as a contested territory. Alsace Lorraine's debut received mixed reviews. Pitchfork compared its sound with St Etienne, foreshadowing collaborations with Ian Catt. After Darla's 2002 South By Southwest showcase, work with the Argentinian children's author-illustrator Isol led to "Dark One," and a supporting appearance on PRI's Studio 360.

References

1979 births
American male singer-songwriters
Living people
Musicians from Charleston, West Virginia
21st-century American singers
21st-century American male singers
Singer-songwriters from West Virginia
Darla Records artists